Peterborough is a city in the county of Cambridgeshire, England, formerly in Northamptonshire.

Peterborough may also refer to:

Australia
Peterborough, South Australia
Peterborough, Victoria

Canada
 Peterborough (electoral district), Ontario
 Peterborough (provincial electoral district), Ontario
 Peterborough, Ontario
 Peterborough County, Ontario

England
 Peterborough (UK Parliament constituency), Cambridgeshire
 City of Peterborough, a district of Cambridgeshire
 Peterborough Rural District, a former district of England
 Soke of Peterborough, a historic area in England

United States
 Peterborough, New Hampshire, a New England town
 Peterborough (CDP), New Hampshire, the main village in the town

Other uses
 Peterborough (HM Prison), in Peterborough, England
 Peterborough railway station, the railway station in Peterborough, England
 Peterborough United F.C., a football team in the English Championship
 HMCS Peterborough, 1944 Royal Canadian Navy corvette
 BR Standard Class 5 73050, a preserved British steam locomotive

See also
 
 Peterboro, New York
 Petersburg (disambiguation), several places